Terry Scales  (born 1933 in Rotherhithe, South London), is a painter and writer.  The River Thames and the Docklands are major influences upon his work.

Biography
Terry Scales grew up in the London Docklands.  His work focuses on growing up in the Docklands and the changes the area has experienced. In 1946, Scales entered the Camberwell School of Art.

Works
Scales is the author of two books:
Vision of Greenwich Reach.  A Homage to the Working Thames and a revealing insight into 20 of Scales' major river paintings with extracts from his Thames Diaries.
Bermondsey Boys.  Published in 1999, it includes colorful stories of love and trouble growing up in the "pre-fab generation."

References

External links
 Harlequin Gallery
Homage to the Working Thames 50 years of Riverside paintings by Terry Scales
The Last Wharves Of Greenwich - paintings by Terry Scales at Paul McPherson Gallery

1933 births
Living people